Igor Jovićević (born 30 November 1973) is a Croatian former professional football player and current manager of Ukrainian club Shakhtar Donetsk.

Playing career
After being labeled as the new Zvonimir Boban while playing in the youth team of the most successful Croatian club, Dinamo Zagreb, with only 17 years he signed, in summer of 1991, a contract with Real Madrid. His transfer cost was one million dollars, however, the contract was based on the fact that the Merengues, in case of lining him in the first team, would have to pay a total of five million, being that the probable cause of having him playing in the B squad. There, he was trained by Rafael Benítez, among others, and had an opportunity of playing along some youngsters, like Raúl and Guti.

On 11 June 1995, he gets injured while playing against Ukraine with the Croatia national under-21 team. After having a one-year pause due to injury, he returned to Croatia to play with another club from the Croatian capital, NK Zagreb. After that, he played with J. League Division 1 club Yokohama F. Marinos, Brazilian club Guarani Futebol Clube and a short spell in France with FC Metz before moving to China to play with Shenyang Dongjin, a discrete passage in Ukraine with Karpaty Lviv before finishing his career in China, again, with a new knee ligaments injury, aged 32. After retiring, he returned to Spain, this time to Marbella, where he owns a bar.

Managerial career

Karpaty Lviv 
In 2010, Jovićević was named the transfer director of Karpaty Lviv. In the 2012–13 season, he managed the U21 squad, and in the 2013–14 season, he led the U19 squad. Following the dismissal of Oleksandr Sevidov in the summer of 2014, he was appointed, initially as caretaker manager, of the senior squad of the club, while in 2015, he was named the head coach.

Celje 
On 10 October 2016, Jovićević took over Slovenian PrvaLiga club Celje. On 19 June 2017, he terminated the contract.

Dinamo Zagreb 
On 20 July 2017, Jovićević took over Dinamo Zagreb II as the head coach, while on 1 July 2018, he was named the head coach of Dinamo Zagreb U19. Managing the U19 squad, he won two Croatian league championships, the FIFA Youth Cup, and led the team in the final of the Premier League International Cup, which they lost to Bayern Munich. He also led the team to the quarter-finals in the UEFA Youth League twice.

On 22 April 2020, following the dismissal of Nenad Bjelica, Jovićević was announced as the new head coach of Dinamo Zagreb. He debuted as Dinamo manager in the 3–1 away win against Varaždin. On 6 July 2020, following the 0–2 away defeat against Rijeka, Jovićević and Dinamo came to a mutual agreement on the early termination of his contract.

Dnipro-1 
On 22 September 2020, following the dismissal of Dmytro Mykhailenko, Jovićević was announced as the new head coach of Dnipro-1. He debuted as manager in the 4-1 defeat away against FC Oleksandriya.

Shakhtar Donetsk 
On 14 July 2022, Jovićević was announced as the new head coach of Shakhtar Donetsk.

Personal life
His father, Čedomir "Čedo" Jovićević (1952–2020) born in Žabljak, Montenegro, was the famous defender of Dinamo Zagreb, playing ten years with the most successful Croatian club. His mother, Sanja, is from Zagreb. 

Igor is married and has two sons: Filip and Marcos, both players of the Dinamo Zagreb Academy.

Career statistics

Managerial statistics

Honours

Manager

Dinamo Zagreb U19 
U19 1. HNL: 2017–18, 2018–19
FIFA Youth Cup: 2018
Kvarnerska Rivijera: 2019

Further reading

References

External links
 
 

1973 births
Living people
Footballers from Zagreb
Croatian people of Montenegrin descent
Association football forwards
Croatian footballers
Croatia under-21 international footballers
Real Madrid Castilla footballers
NK Zagreb players
Yokohama F. Marinos players
Guarani FC players
FC Metz players
Shenyang Dongjin players
FC Karpaty Lviv players
FC Karpaty-2 Lviv players
Croatian Football League players
J1 League players
China League Two players
Ukrainian Premier League players
Ukrainian First League players
Croatian expatriate footballers
Expatriate footballers in Spain
Croatian expatriate sportspeople in Spain
Expatriate footballers in Japan
Croatian expatriate sportspeople in Japan
Expatriate footballers in Brazil
Croatian expatriate sportspeople in Brazil
Expatriate footballers in France
Croatian expatriate sportspeople in France
Expatriate footballers in China
Croatian expatriate sportspeople in China
Expatriate footballers in Ukraine
Croatian expatriate sportspeople in Ukraine
Croatian football managers
FC Karpaty Lviv managers
NK Celje managers
GNK Dinamo Zagreb managers
SC Dnipro-1 managers
FC Shakhtar Donetsk managers
Ukrainian Premier League managers
Croatian expatriate football managers
Expatriate football managers in Ukraine
Expatriate football managers in Slovenia
Croatian expatriate sportspeople in Slovenia